Dunston is a railway station on the Tyne Valley Line, which runs between  and  via . It is owned by Network Rail and managed by Northern Trains.

History 
The station opened in January 1909, on a section of line built by the North Eastern Railway between 1893 and 1909. It linked the lines over the newly commissioned King Edward VII Bridge with the original Newcastle and Carlisle Railway freight route to Redheugh and Dunston Coal Staiths, dating back to 1837.

The station was originally known as Dunston-on-Tyne, and served as the terminus of a shuttle service from Newcastle. As a result of the General Strike of 1926, the service ended and the station was closed in May 1926, briefly being brought back into use for special evacuation trains during World War II.

The station was re-opened as Dunston by British Rail in October 1984. Initially, most services on the Tyne Valley Line called at the station. However, services were later reduced due to low passenger numbers, particularly following the opening of MetroCentre in August 1987. The timetable has though been improved by the current operator (since 2013) and is now comparable to many other stations on the line.

Facilities
The station has a single island platform, which has a ticket machine (which accepts card or contactless payment only), seating, waiting shelter, next train audio display and an emergency help point. There is step-free access to the platform, which is accessed by ramp. There is cycle storage at the station.

Dunston is part of the Northern Trains penalty fare network, meaning that a valid ticket or promise to pay notice is required prior to boarding the train.

Services

All services are operated by Northern Trains.

Rolling stock used: Class 156 Super Sprinter and Class 158 Express Sprinter

References

External links 
 
 

Railway stations in Tyne and Wear
DfT Category F2 stations
Former North Eastern Railway (UK) stations
Railway stations in Great Britain opened in 1909
Railway stations in Great Britain closed in 1918
Railway stations in Great Britain opened in 1919
Railway stations in Great Britain closed in 1926
Railway stations in Great Britain opened in 1984
Reopened railway stations in Great Britain
Northern franchise railway stations